Vriesea glutinosa is a plant species in the genus Vriesea. It is native to Trinidad and to the State of Bolívar in southeastern Venezuela.

Cultivars
 Vriesea 'Amelita'
 Vriesea 'Brasilia'
 Vriesea 'Carlsbad'
 Vriesea 'Double Pleasure'
 Vriesea 'Galaxy'
 Vriesea 'Johnson's #637'
 Vriesea 'Madam Pele'
 Vriesea 'Splendide'
 Vriesea 'Symphonie'
 Vriesea 'Towering Flame'

References

glutinosa
Flora of Venezuela
Flora of Trinidad and Tobago
Plants described in 1856